Daniel Ferry (born 31 January 1977) is a Scottish footballer who played 'senior' for Queen's Park, Dumbarton and Albion Rovers now works as assistant manager at Kirkintilloch Rob Roy since December 2022.

References

1977 births
Scottish footballers
Dumbarton F.C. players
Queen's Park F.C. players
Albion Rovers F.C. players
Scottish Football League players
Living people
Association football midfielders